Steve Schalchlin (born October 4, 1953) is an American songwriter, actor and musician. He is widely regarded as one of the first HIV/AIDS bloggers, beginning his in 1996 to keep family and friends updated on his failing health. When he responded well to a last-ditch effort in treatment by his doctor, he found out that his little "AIDS blog" had garnered a net following. A respected songwriter, Steve put his rebound into music that his partner, playwright Jim Brochu, turned into the critically acclaimed The Last Session.

In 2001, the New York Times profiled Schalchlin's groundbreaking diary. The Times has also raved about Schalchlin and Brochu's musicals,  The Last Session and The Big Voice: God or Merman?

Schalchlin is cited in Shawn Decker's 2006 Book My Pet Virus as an important historical AIDS blogger and an inspiration for Decker's own AIDS blogging efforts.

Schalchlin volunteers time as a board member of GLBT support organizations, Families United Against Hate and Youth Guardian Services. He marched with Soulforce on the historic first march to Jerry Falwell's church. He was a featured performer at the PFLAG national conference and speaker at the March on Washington.

George Michael allowed Schalchlin to play John Lennon's IMAGINE piano in the front yard of Gabi and Alec Clayton in memory of their son, Bill, who committed suicide after a gay bashing. Steve's personal video blogs of the event:

 ;
 ;

Steve's song "My Thanksgiving Prayer" was selected to honor the 30th Anniversary'' of the Beirut barracks bombing, honoring the 241 Marines, Sailors, and Soldiers who served as Peacekeepers in Beirut, Lebanon 1982–1984, killed on October 23, 1983.

Awards
Among his awards and nominations:

Best Musical Score, L.A. Drama Critics Circle, 1997 & 2003
Best L.A. Theatre Production, GLAAD Media Awards, 1997
Best Musical L.A. Ovation Awards (LA's equivalent of the Tony), 2005
Best Musical Nomination NY Drama League, 1997
Best Musical Nomination NY Outer Critics Circle, 1997
Best Theatrical Production nomination, Off-Broadway GLAAD Media Awards 2004
Best Theatrical Production nomination L.A. GLAAD Media Awards, 2004
Best Musical, ADA Awards, 2005
Best Musical Director, ADA Awards, 2005
Best Lead Actor in a Musical nomination, L.A. Ovation Awards, 2005
PFLAG-LA Oscar Wilde Award, 1997 & 2003
Best Concert of a Musical Desert Theatre League Awards 2005
Best Original Writing, Desert Theatre League Awards 2005

References

External links

 Living in the Bonus Round;
 Steve's Blog;
 The Last Session;
 The Big Voice: God or Merman?;
 New World Waking;

1953 births
American musical theatre composers
American gay actors
American gay musicians
American male songwriters
American LGBT songwriters
Living people
People with HIV/AIDS
Songwriters from Arkansas
Gay songwriters
20th-century American LGBT people
21st-century American LGBT people